Nyhomes is New York State's affordable housing lender. Its mission is to expand affordable housing opportunities for low- and moderate-income New Yorkers. “nyhomes” consists of three state agencies: the New York State Housing Finance Agency (HFA), the State of New York Mortgage Agency (SONYMA) and the New York State Affordable Housing Corporation (AHC).

Together, “Nyhomes” finances single-family residential mortgages, multifamily lending housing programs and mortgage insurance for both single-family and multifamily housing. It also provides grants to local governments and not-for-profit organizations to subsidize the construction of new housing and renovation of existing housing for eligible New Yorkers.

HFA and SONYMA are self-funded and do not rely on taxpayer funds. Both agencies issue tax-exempt bonds to provide for their financing. AHC funds are appropriated as part of the State’s annual budget. Funds for SONYMA’s Mortgage Insurance Fund are generated from a portion of the state’s mortgage recording tax surcharge.

See also
 State of New York Mortgage Agency (SONYMA)
 New York State Housing Finance Agency (HFA)

References
 "Housing Agencies 'Merge'", The Bond Buyer, June 15, 2009
 New York State Economic Recovery and Reinvestment Cabinet

External links
 nyhomes.org
  BridgehamptonHomes.org
 About the State of New York Mortgage Agency (SONYMA)
 About the New York State Housing Finance Agency (HFA)
 About the New York State Affordable Housing Corporation (AHC)

Public benefit corporations in New York (state)